Matchless was a British motorcycle manufacturer from 1899 to 1966, with phased final-sales ending by 1970.

Matchless may also refer to:

Matchless Amplifiers, the American guitar amplifier company
British Royal Navy ships named HMS Matchless
USC&GS Matchless, the United States Coast and Geodetic Survey ship
Matchless (pleasure yacht), vessel which sank in 1894 in Morecambe Bay, England
Matchless (film), the Italian Science Fiction comedy
Matchless Mountain (Antarctica), a mountain in Antarctica
Matchless Mountain (Colorado), a mountain in Colorado, USA